Solidago odora, the sweet goldenrod, anisescented goldenrod or fragrant goldenrod, is a North American species of goldenrod within the family Asteraceae. The plant is native to the United States and Mexico, found in every coastal state from Veracruz to New Hampshire and as far inland as Ohio, Missouri, and Oklahoma. It flowers from July through October.

Subspecies include:
Solidago odora subsp. odora - most of species range
Solidago odora subsp. chapmanii (Gray) Semple - Florida only

As a traditional medicine, Solidago odora has a variety of ethnobotanical uses, especially by the Cherokee.

The leaves, which smell of licorice when crushed, can be made into a tea.

References

External links
 

odora
Flora of North America
Plants described in 1789
Plants used in traditional Native American medicine